Baba Heyran (also Romanized as Bābā Ḩeyrān; also known as Bābā Jeyrān) is a village in Hasanabad Rural District, in the Central District of Ravansar County, Kermanshah Province, Iran. At the 2006 census, its population was 25, in 5 families.

References 

Populated places in Ravansar County